The York Lions is the official name for the athletic varsity teams that represent York University in Toronto, Ontario, Canada. The university's varsity teams compete in the Ontario University Athletics conference of U Sports and, where applicable, in the east division. The Lion's logo features a red lion from the school's logo with the university's colours, red and white.

York's former teams were known as the York Yeomen and York Yeowomen, but changed their name to the gender-neutral Lions in 2003.

Interuniversity sport teams
 Badminton, basketball, volleyball, wrestling, water polo, and swimming are played at the Tait McKenzie Centre.
 Cross Country and track & field events are held at the Metro Toronto Track and Field Centre
 Football, rugby, and soccer games are played at York Stadium.
 Hockey games are played at Canlan Ice Sports – York
 Tennis games are played at the Aviva Centre

Lions football

The York Lions football team has been in operation since 1968 and currently compete in the 11-team Ontario University Athletics conference. The program is one of two in U Sports football to have never won a conference championship. The team has been led by head coach Warren Craney since 2010.

Lions men's ice hockey

The York Lions men's ice hockey team competes in the 20-team Ontario University Athletics conference. The team has won three national championships in 1985, 1988, and 1989. The program has also yielded seven Queen's Cup conference championships, most recently in 2017. The team's head coach has been Russ Herrington since 2017.

Lions women's ice hockey

The York Lions women's ice hockey team competes in the 13-team Ontario University Athletics conference. The team's head coach is Dan Church, who has been in that position since 2004 and is the longest-serving active head coach at York. The team was won three McCaw Cup conference championships, coming in 1983, 1987, and 1997.

Lions men's soccer
The York Lions men's soccer team has won five U Sports national championships and seven OUA conference championships. Since the hiring of head coach Carmine Isacco in 2007, the Lions have won six of these conference championships (2007, 2013, 2014, 2015, 2017, 2018) and four national championships (2008, 2010, 2014, 2015). The Lions' 2008 U Sports championship was York's first national championship in any sport in 18 years, and their first soccer championship since 1977. Playing for the Lions, in 2010 Alon Badat was named a U Sports Championship All Star, and the Ontario University Athletics (OUA) West Rookie of the Year, and in 2011 he was a First-Team OUA All-Star. The team currently competes in the 18-team Ontario University Athletics conference.

Lions women's soccer
The York Lions women's soccer team currently competes in the 19-team Ontario University Athletics conference. The program has had four conference championship winners, coming in 2005, 2007, 2009, and 2019. The team's head coach is also Carmine Isacco.

Lions men's volleyball
The York Lions men's volleyball team currently competes in the 13-team Ontario University Athletics conference. The program has featured 13 conference championship winners, most recently in 2005. The highest that the team has finished in the national championship tournament was a second place finish in 1974. David Ta was named the team's interim head coach on August 4, 2022.

Lions women's volleyball
The York Lions women's volleyball team currently competes in the 14-team Ontario University Athletics conference. The program has had a school-record 15 conference championships with the most recent occurring 2009. In the national championship tournament, the Lions have won five bronze medals, most recently in 1991. The team has been led by head coach Jennifer Neilson since 2018.

International competition
This is an incomplete list
Kelsey Webster, Ice Hockey, 2009 Winter Universiade, 
Courtney Unruh, Ice Hockey, 2011 Winter Universiade, 
Kelsey Webster, Ice Hockey, 2011 Winter Universiade, 
Kiri Langford, Ice Hockey, 2011 Women's World Ice Hockey Championships – Division IV, 
Autumn Mills: Baseball, 2015 Pan American Games, 
Brittany Crew, Track and Field, 2017 Summer Universiade (Won gold with a best throw of 18.34 meters) 
Melissa Humana-Paredes, Volleyball, 2018 Commonwealth Games , 2019 Beach Volleyball World Championships

Awards and honours
Lauren Golding, U Sports Athlete of the Month, January 2020

Athletes of the Year
This is an incomplete list

References

External links

 

 
U Sports teams
Sports teams in Toronto
Lions